Ulysses Stevens Stone (December 17, 1878 – December 8, 1962) was an American politician and a U.S. Representative from Oklahoma.

Biography
Born on a farm near Weldon, DeWitt Township, Illinois, Stone was the son of David C. and Sarah J. Hollenbeck Stone. He moved with his parents to Jones, Oklahoma, in 1894, and attended the country schools and the University of Oklahoma at Norman. In 1902 he married Menor Minnie Butler, and they had one daughter, Helen.

Career
Stone engaged in the banking business at Jones, Oklahoma from 1894 to 1905 and as an oil operator at Norman and Oklahoma City in 1905.
He was an unsuccessful candidate for Governor of Oklahoma in 1918 and for election to the United States Senate in 1926.

Elected as a Republican to the Seventy-first Congress, Stone served from March 4, 1929 to March 3, 1931. He was an unsuccessful candidate for reelection in 1930 to the Seventy-second Congress and for election in 1934 to the Seventy-fourth Congress. He resumed activities as an oil operator and also had interests in investments and real estate.

Death
Stone died in Oklahoma City, Oklahoma, on December 8, 1962 (age 83 years, 356 days). He was cremated and his ashes are interred at Rose Hill Burial Park in Oklahoma City.

References

External links

1878 births
1962 deaths
People from DeWitt County, Illinois
Republican Party members of the United States House of Representatives from Oklahoma
University of Oklahoma alumni